Nosphistica dolichina is a moth in the family Lecithoceridae. It was described by Chun-Sheng Wu in 1996. It is found in Yunnan, China.

References

Moths described in 1996
Nosphistica